Jean-Marie Winling (born 1947) is a French actor. He has appeared in more than a hundred films since 1972.

Filmography

Theater

External links 
 

1947 births
Living people
People from Sète
French male film actors
French National Academy of Dramatic Arts alumni
French male television actors
20th-century French male actors
21st-century French male actors